Christian John Morton (born April 28, 1981) is a former American football cornerback. He was drafted by the New England Patriots in the seventh round of the 2004 NFL Draft. He played college football at Illinois.

Morton was also a member of the Cleveland Browns, Atlanta Falcons, Washington Redskins, Carolina Panthers, Denver Broncos and Tennessee Titans.

Early years
Morton attended Riverview Gardens High School in St. Louis, Missouri where he won the Missouri 5A state championship his Senior season as the starting quarterback and defensive back.

College career
Morton played college football at the University of Illinois. He was initially recruited as a quarterback and played there the first two years. He then made the switch to cornerback in spring drills in 2000.

Professional career

New England Patriots
Morton was the 32nd pick of the seventh round of the 2004 NFL Draft by the New England Patriots, the last pick of the draft before the supplemental picks.  He was released from the Patriots before the 2004 season.

Second stint with Falcons
Morton spent the 2005 training camp with the Falcons before being waived on August 26, 2005.  Atlanta re-signed Morton on September 15, 2005, and saw action in three games, including one start. He was released by the Falcons on November 30, 2005.

Second stint with Redskins
On December 16, the Washington Redskins signed Morton to the practice squad.  The Redskins promoted Morton to the active roster on December 28, and Morton made his debut for the Redskins on January 1, 2006.

Carolina Panthers
Morton was signed mid-season in 2006 by the Carolina Panthers and saw action in seven games before being place on the injured reserve list with a hamstring injury on December 12, 2006.  In those seven games he recorded 11 tackles, one interception, and one pass deflected.

Tennessee Titans
After spending the 2008 season out of football, Morton was signed by the Tennessee Titans on January 8, 2009. He was released on July 7, 2009.

References

1981 births
Living people
Players of American football from Missouri
American football cornerbacks
American football safeties
Illinois Fighting Illini football players
New England Patriots players
Cleveland Browns players
Atlanta Falcons players
Washington Redskins players
Carolina Panthers players
Denver Broncos players
Tennessee Titans players